The House Without a Name is a 1956 short documentary film written and produced by Valentine Davies for the Motion Picture Relief Fund. It was nominated for an Academy Award for Best Documentary Short.

See also
List of American films of 1956

References

External links

1956 films
1956 short films
1950s short documentary films
American short documentary films
Universal Pictures short films
1956 documentary films
1950s English-language films
1950s American films
American black-and-white films